Tramain Jacobs (born May 20, 1992) is a former American football cornerback. He first enrolled at Mississippi Gulf Coast Community College before transferring to  Texas A&M University. He attended Covington High School in Covington, Louisiana. He has been a member of the Baltimore Ravens, New York Giants, Oakland Raiders, Toronto Argonauts and Detroit Lions.

Early years
Jacobs participated in football and track and field for the Covington High School Lions. He was named first-team Louisiana Class 5A All-State as a kick returner his senior year and was ranked as the No. 6 DB nationally by SuperPrep. He placed in the region triple jump meet in track.

College career
Jacobs first played college football for the Mississippi Gulf Coast Bulldogs of Mississippi Gulf Coast Community College from 2010 to 2011. He recorded 34 tackles, 13 pass deflections and two interceptions in 2011. He also recovered two fumbles, returning one for a touchdown, and totaled 616 yards and  one touchdown on 28 punt and kickoff returns.

Jacobs transferred to play for the Texas A&M Aggies from 2012 to 2013. He played in 26 games for the Aggies, totaling 55 tackles, 13 pass deflections and two interceptions.

Professional career

Baltimore Ravens
Jacobs was signed by the Baltimore Ravens on May 12, 2014 after going undrafted in the 2014 NFL Draft. He made his NFL debut on November 9, 2014 against the Tennessee Titans. He was released by the Ravens on August 31, 2015.

New York Giants
Jacobs was signed to the New York Giants' practice squad on September 15, 2015. On November 7, 2015, he was elevated to the active roster. He was waived by the Giants on November 16 and re-signed to the team's practice squad on November 23, 2015. He was promoted to the active roster on December 8, 2015. He was released by the Giants on August 4, 2016.

Oakland Raiders
Jacobs signed with the Oakland Raiders on August 5, 2016. On August 29, 2016, he was released by the Raiders.

Toronto Argonauts
Jacobs signed with the Toronto Argonauts on March 14, 2017. He was released by the Argonauts on June 18, 2017.

Detroit Lions
On August 8, 2017, Jacobs signed with the Detroit Lions. He was waived/injured on September 1, 2017, and placed on injured reserve. He was released on September 5, 2017.

References

External links
Texas A&M Aggies profile

Living people
1992 births
American football defensive backs
Canadian football defensive backs
American players of Canadian football
African-American players of American football
Mississippi Gulf Coast Bulldogs football players
Texas A&M Aggies football players
Baltimore Ravens players
New York Giants players
Oakland Raiders players
Toronto Argonauts players
Detroit Lions players
Players of American football from Louisiana
People from Covington, Louisiana
21st-century African-American sportspeople